Grosvenor Arch is a unique sandstone double arch located within Grand Staircase–Escalante National Monument in southern Kane County, Utah, United States. It is named to honor Gilbert Hovey Grosvenor (1875–1966), a president of the National Geographic Society, publishers of the National Geographic Magazine.

Located in northern Kane County, it is close to and south of Kodachrome Basin State Park and is accessed from the north or south via Road 400, a dirt road that traverses Cottonwood Canyon in the western portion of the national monument.

The site is well maintained and has an outhouse restroom and cement benches.  There is a concrete sidewalk that goes almost to the base of the arch which is handicap accessible.

References

External links 

Natural arches of Utah
Grand Staircase–Escalante National Monument
Landforms of Kane County, Utah